No Sinner is a blues rock quartet based in Vancouver, British Columbia, Canada. The group is led by singer-songwriter Colleen Rennison.

History 
Rennison worked in New York City but returned to her hometown of Vancouver to begin writing with former associate, Parker Bossley. She started a rotating back-up band to fill her weekly Thursday night performances at Guilt and Company, which was then a club in Vancouver's Gastown district. Among the musicians playing in the band were current bandmates Eric Campbell (guitar) and Ian Browne (drums). No Sinner recorded their six-track debut album Boo Hoo Hoo, which was released in 2012 on the Vancouver-based indie label, First Love Records.

No Sinner later signed with Provogue Records, with whom they released Boo Hoo Hoo throughout North America. Following the release of their debut album, No Sinner went on a North American tour, during which they performed at the South by Southwest (SXSW) festival and the WXPN "Triple-A Non-Comm Convention". Their "Non-Comm" performance briefly placed them amongst artists such as Coldplay, Phish, and Jack White under the category of "Annually Most Added" artists on non-commercial radio.

Interviews and press coverage of the band has appeared in VICE/Noisey, Indie Shuffle, Classic Rock Magazine, Exclaim!, and others. No Sinner has also played festivals worldwide, including the UK's Dot to Dot Festival.

The band's second album, Old Habits Die Hard, was released in May 2016.

Personnel 
Colleen Rennison - vocals
Eric Campbell - guitar and backing vocals
Ian Browne - drums
Matt Camirand - bass

Discography 
Boo Hoo Hoo (2014) (Provogue Records)
Old Habits Die Hard (2016)

References

External links
 Official No Sinner Website

Canadian blues rock musical groups
Musical groups from Vancouver
Provogue Records artists